Ishtar is a Belgian (Flemish) folk band who represented Belgium at the 2008 Eurovision Song Contest with the song "O Julissi", sung in an imaginary language. They competed in the first semi-final on 20 May 2008.

O Julissi 
"O Julissi" is a song by Ishtar. The band's site  claims that the song is in an imaginary language. There is, however, a certain similarity to Ukrainian; in particular, the first line is fully understandable (Ukrainian "Ой у лісі на ялині", meaning "Oh, in the forest on a spruce"). The folk song represented Belgium at the semi-finals of Eurovision Song Contest 2008, at 20 May 2008, in Belgrade, but did not proceed to the finals. The single was released 14 March 2008. The song entered the Belgian Ultratop at #7. In its second week, O Julissi topped the list.

Ishtar's song was elected after they won the final of Eurosong 2008. Ishtar, until then an unknown band, defeated better known artists, like pop singers Sandrine and Brahim. The  other contestants in the final were rock group Paranoiacs and Nelson, who had written a modern ballad.

Band members 
 Soetkin Baptist
 Michel Vangheluwe
 Ann Vandaele
 Marleen Vandaele
 Els Vandaele
 Hans Vandaele
 Lode Cartrysse
 Frank Markey
 Korneel Taeckens
 Karel Vercruysse

External links

 
Incomplete list of songs

Eurovision Song Contest entrants for Belgium
Eurovision Song Contest entrants of 2008
Belgian folk music groups